Nokia Asha 309 is a mid-range phone and the successor to the Nokia Asha 306. The phone was announced in 2012, September and is expected to be released in Q4, 2012. The phone features a capacitive touch screen and WLAN Wi-Fi over the dual-sim feature seen in Nokia Asha 308.

See also
 List of Nokia products
 Comparison of smartphones

References

External links
Nokia product page
A database of utilities

Asha 306